Ravi Kichlu (December 24, 1932 – 1993),  popularly known as Pandit Ravi Kichlu,  was a prominent classical Hindustani vocalist of Agra gharana, who formed a well-known duo with his brother Vijay Kichlu. He studied Dhrupad with the Dagar Brothers.

Kashmiri people
Hindustani singers
1932 births
1993 deaths
20th-century Indian male classical singers